Iwona Pyżalska is a Polish sprint canoer who competed in the mid-2000s. She won two silver medals at the 2005 ICF Canoe Sprint World Championships in Zagreb, earning them in the K-4 200 m and K-4 500 m events.

References

Living people
Polish female canoeists
Year of birth missing (living people)
Place of birth missing (living people)
ICF Canoe Sprint World Championships medalists in kayak